Nutri Ventures (also known as Nutri Ventures – The Quest for the 7 Kingdoms) is an animated television series produced by the Nutri Ventures Corporation and Dentsu Aegis Network, Entertainment One Television in United States, that is distributed through Hulu Kids.

Synopsis 
Young heroes Theo, Lena, Ben, and Nina go on a mission to discover food-group kingdoms in this animated series. Traveling from kingdom to kingdom, the heroes discover the nutripowers of the lost foods that they rescue. Their goal is to bring healthy food back to their city, where supervillain Alex Grand makes sure that no food exists. With childhood obesity on the rise, "Nutri Ventures" aims to create a positive message about healthy eating for young people.

Characters

Main 
Theo is the leader of the main group. He keeps the medallion with him.
Lena is the most intelligent of the group. She keeps the NutriPad with her to level nutrition on people. 
Ben is fat and has a crush on Inca.
Nina is playful and cute. She is Theo's younger sister.
Alex Grand is the main antagonist of the series. The president of the Unhealthy Food Grand Corporation, he replaced all the food in the world with a food-like product called "Genex 100".
Murdock was Alex's elderly father, who had a vision of Theo saving the food.
Nose is Alex's second-in-command.
Nexus is the leader of the seven Guardians.
The Gugas are small and spherical bulldog-like creatures. The purple one usually accompanies the main four.
Guardian Purple is Theo's grandfather.
Teacher/Phyllis is Theo's teacher. She thinks of Alex Grand as a role model.

Episodes

Series overview

The Origins (2012)

Season 1: The Beginning of Nutritions (2012)

Season 2: Kingdom of Medieval (2012)

Season 3: Boosting West (2013)

Season 4: Intelligence Sea (2013)

Season 5: Apocalypse Vegetables (2014)

Broadcast 
Portugal: RTP2 (September, 2012); Canal Panda (October, 2012); RTP1 (2016)
US: YouTube, Kabillion (April, 2013);  Qubo (April, 2016)
South Africa: eToonz (2018)

Reception 
Common Sense Media gave the series an extremely positive review, rating it at five stars and praising it for its lack of extreme violence and promotion of healthy eating like Clara in Foodland.

References

External links 
 

2010s animated television series
Portuguese children's animated fantasy television series
Child superheroes
Television series by Entertainment One
English-language television shows
Children's education television series
Animated television series about children
Television shows set in Portugal